Modern Times Forever (Stora Enso Building, Helsinki) is a 2011 film by Danish artists' group Superflex. It is currently the second-longest film ever made, lasting 240 hours (10 days). The film shows how Helsinki's Stora Enso headquarters building would decay over the next few millennia. The film was originally projected against the building itself.

See also
 List of longest films
 Film festival

References

External links

2011 films
Danish avant-garde and experimental films
2010s avant-garde and experimental films